Yong Mun Sen (10January 18961962) was a Malaysian artist and one of the founder of Nanyang Academy of Fine Arts in Singapore, then Malaya. Born Yong Yen Lang in Kuching, Sarawak, he changed his name to Yong Mun Sen in 1922.

Biography
Born in Kuching, Sarawak where his father ran a coconut estate, in 1901 Sen went to Dabu County in Meizhou City, Kwangtung (now Guangdong) Province in China for schooling in brush use and calligraphy and returned to Kuching in 1910. Sen always spoke of how seeing a Japanese artist painting with watercolors had made an indelible impression on him.

He is widely known as the Father of Malaysian Painting. Although trained in formal Chinese brush painting and calligraphy in China, as an artist he was drawn to watercolours and later oils.

Sen returned to China in 1914. His paintings during this visit were marked by a grandiose theme. He painted lions and tigers, images that were hugely popular with the warlords of the time. He married Lam Sek Foong in 1916, and returned to Sarawak in 1917.

He settled in Penang in 1922, where he had his own art studios on Penang Road and later Northam Road.

Mun Sen is noted for his watercolour landscape paintings, which incorporate influences from Chinese art resulting in more airy and generalised compositions rather than in more detailed or factual depictions. Since his death in 1962, his works have retained an important and honoured place in Malaysian art.

Two of his children would follow in his footsteps, ChengWah and KhengWah. Both are well-established artists in their own media.

References

External links

1896 births
1962 deaths
20th-century Malaysian painters
Malaysian painters
Malaysian people of Chinese descent
Malaysian people of Hakka descent
People from Dabu
People from Kuching